Abu'l-Husayn al-Qasim ibn Ubayd Allah was a senior official of the Abbasid Caliphate who served as vizier from April 901 until his own death in October 904.

Hailing from the Banu Wahb, a family of Nestorian Christian origin that had served in the caliphal bureaucracy since late Umayyad times, Ubayd Allah was the son and grandson of viziers. He had served as aide to his father, Ubayd Allah ibn Sulayman, during the latter's decade-long vizierate, and then succeeded him upon his death, heading the government during the last months of the reign of al-Mu'tadid and the early years of al-Muktafi. Al-Qasim largely dominated the young al-Muktafi, who awarded him with the title of Wali al-Dawla and gave one of his daughters to one of al-Qasim's sons.

Unlike his father, who was widely esteemed for his honesty and justice, al-Qasim was corrupt and cruel, ordering the executions of anyone that displeased him or presented a potential challenge, such as the Saffarid emir Amr ibn al-Layth, the general Badr al-Mu'tadidi, or the poet Ibn al-Rumi. The powerful finance secretary Ali ibn al-Furat was saved from a similar fate only by al-Qasim's illness and death. This death meant the end of the Banu Wahb's hold on power, which now passed to the Banu'l-Furat. Only a generation later would al-Qasim's sons al-Husayn and Muhammad also rise to become viziers.

References

Sources
 

9th-century births
904 deaths
Viziers of the Abbasid Caliphate
Banu Wahb
9th-century people from the Abbasid Caliphate
10th-century people from the Abbasid Caliphate
9th-century Arabs
10th-century Arabs